Sandra Marie Fox (née Kessler; born July 13, 1963) is an American voice actress who has had numerous roles in various animated cartoon, anime and video games. She portrayed the live-action Betty Boop and has provided her voice for Universal Studios and King Features Syndicate for much of their promotional activities and related media and merchandise from 1991 to 2018.
She began voice acting on various animated shows such as The Simpsons, King of the Hill and Futurama. Her first major roles in anime were as Kiyoko in the Animaze dub of Akira and Lady Aska in Magic Knight Rayearth. Other anime characters include Mina and Momiji in Naruto, Sumomo in Chobits, Tachikoma in Ghost in the Shell: Stand Alone Complex, and Paiway in Vandread.  In video game franchises, she provides the English voice of Mistral and A-20 in the .hack series, Peashy in Hyperdimension Neptunia, and Flonne in Disgaea. In cartoons, she voices Harmony in Hi Hi Puffy AmiYumi and Mipsy Mipson in As Told by Ginger. In 2014, she was announced as the voice of Chibiusa/Black Lady/Sailor Chibi Moon in the Viz Media dubs of Sailor Moon and Sailor Moon Crystal.

Early life and career 
Fox was born in Monroeville, Pennsylvania, and grew up in Swissvale. She performed in musicals in high school, and worked at Kennywood amusement park during some of the summers. In the early 1980s, she worked for the Walt Disney Company in Orlando where she would participate in their live stage shows.  She was working as a hostess at a Bennigan's Irish pub when she was asked to audition with the 1920s-themed jazz band The Cocoanut Manor Orchestra as their singer. She sang with the group for 11 years, performing songs done by singers Helen Kane and Annette Henshaw, the former was an inspiration for the Betty Boop character. In 1988, she joined the Orlando Magic's inaugural dance team, and was part of the Magic Girls for three years. She auditioned and then landed the position as the official Betty Boop for Universal Studios. In 1991, she started working full-time at their Hollywood park and on national and worldwide tours, visiting shows such as Good Morning America and The Rosie O'Donnell Show. In 1998, she voiced Betty Boop for "The Toon Lagoon Betty Boop" attraction at Universal Studios' Islands of Adventure in Orlando. In 2012, she joined a Lancome promotion in Paris as the voice of Betty Boop in their commercials.

Voice-over career 
Fox was inspired to go into voice acting after having taken a voice-over workshop in 1990 with Sue Blu, a Los Angeles-based animation director and producer. After moving to Los Angeles for the Betty Boop gig, she voiced supporting and background characters for The Simpsons, mostly with kids voices and loop groups, which she did for three years. She also voiced characters for the related productions Futurama and King of the Hill. One of her first anime roles was Sakura in Ninja Cadets. She voiced Lady Aska, a major character in the second season of Magic Knight Rayearth, a series in which she also rewrote lyrics and sang the theme songs. She voiced Kyoko in the Pioneer/Animaze dub of Akira. She voiced supporting character T-AI in a 2001 version of Transformers: Robots in Disguise. She voiced Paiway, the ship's nurse in Vandread. In 2003, she voiced the title characters in Omishi Magical Theater Risky Safety and Ground Defense Force! Mao-chan, as well as Sumomo in Bang Zoom's dub of  Chobits. In his review of Mao-chan, Ryan Mathews of Anime News Network wrote that "Bang Zoom picked the perfect actress to play the lead role. [Fox], the owner of perhaps the cutest "little girl" voice in anime dub acting, is her usual adorable self as M.A.O." In 2004, she voiced Maya in Burn-Up Scramble and Tachikoma in the Ghost in the Shell: Stand Alone Complex series. For 2005–06, she would get involved in the Naruto series as Momiji and Mina and the Di Gi Charat series as Piyoko. In 2007, she and Lex Lang hosted a Voice Actor Boot Camp at Bang Zoom! Entertainment to help up and coming voice actors get into the business. In 2014, when Viz Media announced they were redubbing Sailor Moon and dubbing its new Sailor Moon Crystal series, Fox was chosen to voice Chibiusa, also known as Sailor Chibi Moon and Black Lady.

In video games, she voiced Mistral and A-20 in the .hack video game series, Flonne in various incarnations of Disgaea and Marona in Phantom Brave. She voiced Peashy in the Hyperdimension Neptunia series.

Personal life and other ventures 
Fox is married to fellow voice actor Lex Lang. They live in Studio City, California. In 1998 they co-founded the Love Planet Foundation, a non-profit organization which creates educational materials for children on the importance of recycling, world water awareness, and the preservation of the planet. They also created Love Planet Productions, which includes several multimedia projects such as anime presentation shows, toddler shows and products, and Zen programming. In 2006, they founded a bottled spring water business called H2Om Water with Intention, which has received recognition as a sponsor at several events including Sting's Rainforest Foundation Carnegie Hall Concert and the Elevate Film Festival. Fox and Lang are Deepak Chopra meditation instructors.

Filmography

Anime

Film

Animation

Video games

Other voice roles

Other live-action roles

References

Bibliography

External links 
 
 
 
 

1963 births
Living people
People from Monroeville, Pennsylvania
Actresses from Pennsylvania
American film actresses
American television actresses
American video game actresses
American voice actresses
National Basketball Association cheerleaders
People from Studio City, Los Angeles
20th-century American actresses
21st-century American actresses